Abolição (Abolition) is a middle-class neighborhood of the North Zone of the city of Rio de Janeiro, Brazil.

References

Neighbourhoods in Rio de Janeiro (city)